Paya() is a village in Kyain Seikgyi Township, Kawkareik District, in the Kayin State of Myanmar. It is the home of Paya Taung.

References

External links
 "Paya Map — Satellite Images of Paya" Maplandia World Gazetteer

Populated places in Kayin State